Two ships of the United States Navy have borne the name Abarenda.

 , was a collier that served during World War I.
 , was a storage tanker that served during World War II.

References

United States Navy ship names